The Red Army Memorial Museum is the official Chinese historical source on the topic, and is located in Red Army Park, at Rugao, Jiangsu province in China. It is primarily a national cemetery, but it also has thousands of exhibits, a small eatery, a curio shop, and guides who speak European languages. It is a major attraction for non-Chinese who visit the country.

See also
 List of museums in China

Sources 
 Official website 
 Gangu News

Museums in Jiangsu